The Custos rotulorum, Latin for "keeper of the rolls" within civil government, is the keeper of the English , Welsh and Northern Irish (and, prior to 1922, southern Irish) county records. The Custos is also the principal Justice of the Peace of the county and keeper of the records of the sessions of the local courts and, by virtue of those offices, the highest civil official in the county. The position is now largely ceremonial and generally undertaken by the Lord Lieutenant of the county.

The office also exists in Jamaica.

England

Bedfordshire
Berkshire
Buckinghamshire
Cambridgeshire
Cheshire
Cornwall
Cumberland
Derbyshire
Devon
Dorset
Durham
East Riding of Yorkshire
Essex
Gloucestershire
Hampshire
Herefordshire
Hertfordshire
Huntingdonshire
Kent
Lancashire
Leicestershire
Lincolnshire
Middlesex
Norfolk
Northamptonshire
North Riding of Yorkshire
Northumberland
Nottinghamshire
Oxfordshire
Rutland
Shropshire
Somerset
Staffordshire
Suffolk
Surrey
Sussex
Warwickshire
Westmorland
West Riding of Yorkshire
Wiltshire
Worcestershire

Wales
Anglesey
Brecknockshire
Caernarvonshire
Cardiganshire
Carmarthenshire
Denbighshire
Flintshire
Glamorgan
Merionethshire
Monmouthshire
Montgomeryshire
Pembrokeshire
Radnorshire

Ireland
Antrim
Armagh
Carlow (merged with Lord Lieutenancy before 1838)
Cavan
Clare
Cork
Donegal
Down
Dublin
Fermanagh (merged with Lord Lieutenancy before 1963)
Galway
Kerry (merged with Lord Lieutenancy before 1746)
Kildare
Kilkenny
King's County
Leitrim
Limerick
Londonderry
Longford
Louth (merged with Lord Lieutenancy before 1911)
Mayo
Meath
Monaghan
Queen's County
Roscommon
Sligo
Tyrone
Tipperary
Waterford
Westmeath
Wexford
Wicklow

Jamaica
St. Elizabeth Hon. Beryl Rochester, 10 February 2014 to date.

See also
Custos rotulorum
Lists of lord lieutenancies
The Custos Rotulorum Act, 2011 - Jamaica